Palko or Palkó is an Eastern European surname and male given name. Notable people with this name include:

 Christian Palko , better known as Cage (rapper) (born 1973), American rapper and actor
 Dávid Palkó (born 1989), Hungarian football player
 Franz Xaver Palko (1724-1767), Silesian painter
 Fruzsina Palkó (born 1992), Hungarian handball player
 Jiří Palko (1941–2014), Czech rower
 Palkó Dárdai (born 1999), German-Hungarian football player
 Tyler Palko (born 1983), American football player
 Vladimír Palko (born 1957), Slovak politician